Noviherbaspirillum agri is a Gram-negative, rod-shaped, aerobic and motile bacterium from the genus of Noviherbaspirillum which has been isolated from grassland soil from Biratnagar in Nepal.

References

Burkholderiales
Bacteria described in 2017